Edwin Fowler (1841 – 31 May 1909) was an Australian cricketer. He played one first-class cricket match for Victoria in 1865 and 16 for Canterbury in New Zealand between 1869 and 1882.

See also
 List of Victoria first-class cricketers

References

1841 births
1909 deaths
Australian cricketers
Canterbury cricketers
Victoria cricketers
People from Islington (district)
Cricketers from Greater London
Melbourne Cricket Club cricketers